Stephen Roche (born 5 July 1986) is an Irish footballer who plays for Long Island Rough Riders.

He previously played in the Football League with Millwall and in the League of Ireland with UCD. Roche plays primarily as a central midfielder.

Career
Roche signed with F.C. New York of the USL Pro league on 18 March 2011.

In May 2013 Roche made his debut for Long Island Rough Riders in a 2–2 draw with Baltimore

References

External links

https://web.archive.org/web/20101207121538/http://www.ucdsoccer.com/airtricity-league/premier-division/squad-a-management-profiles?sobi2Task=sobi2Details&catid=7&sobi2Id=39
http://inform.fai.ie/Statsportal/PlayerDetails.aspx?playerID=93144
https://archive.today/20130616105709/http://www.uslsoccer.com/teams/58149807/22341-58149874/35326172.html

1986 births
Living people
Association footballers from Dublin (city)
Republic of Ireland association footballers
Association football midfielders
Millwall F.C. players
University College Dublin A.F.C. players
F.C. New York players
Long Island Rough Riders players
English Football League players
League of Ireland players
USL Championship players
USL League Two players